Russell Lee is a Singaporean author best known as the creator of True Singapore Ghost Stories, a well-known book series of ghost stories in Singapore, Malaysia, other parts of Asia ever since the release of Book 1 in 1989.

Lee has had a lasting impact on Singapore publishing. His first book was the first of many that were published for the mass market. Lee surpassed 30,000 copies in three months.

Lee has never provided any photograph of himself or revealed anything about his personal life. Whenever he appears in public, he wears a mask and clothes that cover every inch of his body. The name Russell Lee is a pseudonym. He mentions "I will have to take off my mask, put down my pen, get out of the Russell Lee regulation black outfit, and finally call it a day”.

True Singapore Ghost Stories
As of 2020, 27 books in the True Singapore Ghost Stories series have been released. With over 1.5 million copies sold worldwide.

In 2014, Lee released the True Singapore Ghost Stories 25th Year Special Edition. The book looks back at the first 25 years of the TSGS series.

Book 26, the latest in the series, was released in 2020. Lee has said he hopes to reach Book 50.

The book series has also been made into a 13-part TV series.

Works

See also
True Singapore Ghost Stories book series
James Lee, fellow writer under Angsana Books

References

External links
 True Singapore Ghost Stories on the Flame Of The Forest website

Singaporean writers
Year of birth missing (living people)
Place of birth missing (living people)
Living people